Earl Harrison may refer to:

 Earl G. Harrison (1899–1955), American attorney, academician and public servant
 Earl Harrison (baseball) (1900–?), American Negro leagues baseball player
 Earl Harrison (basketball) (born 1961), retired American basketball player
 Earl Harrison (rugby league), Australian rugby league footballer